Adrian is an unincorporated community in Armstrong County, Pennsylvania, United States. Adrian has a post office with ZIP code 16210. Adrian, along with the rest of Armstrong County, is part of the Pittsburgh metropolitan area.

History
Montgomeryville, Adrian P.O., appears in the 1876 Atlas of Armstrong County, Pennsylvania.

References

Unincorporated communities in Armstrong County, Pennsylvania
Unincorporated communities in Pennsylvania